Peter G. Rowe is an architect, researcher, author, and educator. Rowe is currently the Raymond Garbe Professor of Architecture and Urban Design and the Harvard Distinguished Service Professor at the Harvard University Graduate School of Design, where he has held various teaching positions since 1985. He is also the chairman and co-founder of the New York-based practice SURBA – Studio for Urban Analysis, founded in 2012.

Career
Rowe served as the director of the School of Architecture at Rice University from 1981 to 1985, where he had taught since 1971. While at Rice, he directed numerous multi-disciplinary research projects through the Rice Center, where he was vice president from 1978 onwards, and at the Southwest Center for Urban Research. Since 1985, Rowe has taught and held leadership positions at the Harvard University Graduate School of Design, where he served as Dean from 1992 to 2004, Chairman of the Urban Planning and Design Department from 1988 until 1992, and Director of the Urban Design Programs from 1985 until 1990. He is also an Honorary Professor at several Chinese universities and an honorand of the Academia dei Benigni, Italy (2002); and an Honorary Professor at the Xian University of Architecture and Technology (1999–present).

His current practice, SURBA-Studio for Urban Analysis, is an urban research firm and think-tank co-founded with Carlos Arnaiz in 2012. Based in Brooklyn, New York, the studio focuses on exploring urbanization at various scales, particularly in developing countries. In 2020, Rowe and Arnaiz published "When Urbanization Comes to Ground," a book of essays reflecting on SURBA's work exploring urbanization in China, Colombia, and the Philippines. Between 1981 and 1987, Rowe also spent significant time in professional practice as Principal at Environmental Planning and Design in Houston, Texas. At EplDes, Rowe was involved in a number of significant projects working with urban modeling, growth forecasting, environmental impact assessment, urban design and planning, and public policy evaluation.

Publications
Rowe is the author of over twenty six books. Between 1987 and 1993, Rowe published three seminal books on design theory: Design Thinking (1987), Making a Middle Landscape (1991), and Modernity and Housing (1993). Other books include Urban Blocks and Grids: A brief History, Technical Features, and Outcomes (2019), Korean Modern: The Matter of Identity (2021), and South-East Asia Modern: From Roots to Contemporary Turns (2022), in addition to several books on China, including Modern Urban Housing in China: 1840–2000 (2001).

Honorary professorships, memberships, and awards
Rowe is the recipient of numerous awards, including the Distinguished Alumni Award from Rice University in 2014 and the Picton Hopkins Prize in Design (1967) among others. He has also held several honorary professorships, including at Tongji University (2003), Xi-an University of Architecture and Technology (1999–) and the Chinese University of Hong Kong (2014–).

References

External links
 Peter Rowe Harvard Graduate School of Design/Person/Peter G. Rowe
 SURBA – About SURBA – Studio for Urban Analysis

Living people
Rice University alumni
University of Melbourne alumni
Harvard Graduate School of Design faculty
Year of birth missing (living people)